Aziza is the first album by Aziza Mustafa Zadeh. It was released by Columbia Records in 1991.

Music
Zadeh wrote all fifteen of the tracks on the album. She sings on three of them.

Release and reception
Aziza Mustafa Zadeh was released by Columbia Records in November 1991. The AllMusic reviewer wrote: "the virtuosic pianist clearly has the potential to be a major force in jazz. At this early stage, Aziza already had something of her own to offer". 

Jazz: The Rough Guide described it as a "beautiful unaccompanied album", and added that "Anyone who feared that the world-music movement would necessarily bypass keyboard instruments must think again".

Track listing
 "Quiet Alone" – 3:31
 "Tea on the Carpet" – 4:03
 "Cemetery" – 6:47
 "Inspiration" – 4:37
 "Reflection" – 4:07
 "Oriental Fantasy" – 11:16
 "Blue Day" – 4:16
 "Character" – 5:16
 "Aziza's Dream" – 4:50
 "Chargah" – 5:09
 "My Ballad" – 4:17
 "I Cannot Sleep" – 6:46
 "Moment" – 0:47
 "Exprompt" – 2:02
 "Two Candles" – 5:57

Musicians
 Aziza Mustafa Zadeh - piano, vocals

References

1991 albums
Aziza Mustafa Zadeh albums
Post-bop albums
Columbia Records albums